The 2000 Canadian Grand Prix (formally the Grand Prix Air Canada 2000) was a Formula One motor race held on 18 June 2000 at the Circuit Gilles Villeneuve, Montreal, Quebec, Canada before 100,000 people. It was the eighth round of the 2000 Formula One World Championship and the 38th Canadian Grand Prix. Ferrari driver Michael Schumacher won the 69-lap race from pole position. His teammate Rubens Barrichello finished second with Giancarlo Fisichella third driving at the Benetton team.

Michael Schumacher led the World Drivers' Championship heading into the race with his team Ferrar first in the World Constructors' Championship. He qualified on pole position by setting the fastest lap time in qualifying and began alongside McLaren driver David Coulthard. Barrichello began from third, alongside Coulthard's teammate Mika Häkkinen. The front two of Michael Schumacher and Coulthard battled for first position until Coulthard served a ten-second stop-go penalty on lap 14 because his mechanics worked on his car 15 seconds before the race commenced. Just before half distance, Michael Schumacher made an early pit stop, allowing Barrichello lead the race until his own pit stop on lap 43. By this time rain began to fall and drivers made the switch to wet-weather tyres. Michael Schumacher retained his lead for the rest of the race and took the victory by one-tenth of a second over Barrichello.

The victory was Michael Schumacher's fifth of the season and the 40th of his career. It extended his lead in the World Drivers' Championship to twenty-two points over Coulthard, with Häkkinen a further two points behind. Ferrari increased their lead in the World Constructors' Championship to eighteen points ahead of McLaren. Benetton, on 18 points, demoted the Williams team to fourth place, with nine races of the season remaining.

Background
The 2000 Canadian Grand Prix was the eighth of the seventeen events in the 2000 Formula One World Championship and took place at the  clockwise temporary road course Circuit Gilles Villeneuve in Montreal, Quebec, Canada on 18 June 2000. Sole tyre supplier Bridgestone brought the soft and medium dry compound tyres to the Grand Prix.

Going into the race, Ferrari driver Michael Schumacher led the World Drivers' Championship with 46 points, ahead of McLaren's David Coulthard on 34 points and his teammate Mika Häkkinen on 29 points. Rubens Barrichello of Ferrari was fourth with 22 points and Benetton driver Giancarlo Fisichella was fifth on 14 points. In the World Constructors' Championship Ferrari were leading with 68 points ahead of the McLaren squad in second on 63 points. Williams with 15 points were third and Benetton were fourth with 14 points, with Jordan fifth with 9 points.

In the weeks leading up to the event, the Société de Transport de la Communauté Urbaine De Montréal (STCUM) announced that they would hold strikes over pension fund contributions during the Grand Prix weekend. STCUM chose those dates due to the event's high-profile status as public transport was classified as an essential service over the weekend. It would also result in the road leading to the circuit being blocked off to spectators. STCUM appeared before Essential Services Council on 9 June to discuss producing a contingency plan to ensure spectators would attend the Grand Prix with full services running. An agreement was reached on 13 June with 60 per cent of transport workers voting in favour of improved pay and pension, allowing the race to go unaffected.

Barrichello set the first day's fastest times, ahead of McLaren test driver Olivier Panis. Testing was halted when Prost's Nick Heidfeld and Luciano Burti both experienced engine and electronic failures respectively. Häkkinen was fastest on the second day. BAR driver Ricardo Zonta lost control of his car and crashed into the barriers at the Parabolica corner, limiting his testing time as repairs were made to his car. Jenson Button for Williams was quickest on the third day. Ferrari undertook additional testing at their private facility, the Fiorano Circuit, with their test driver Luca Badoer who performed practice pit stops and starts, utilising different car set-ups, testing new car components and ran on an artificially wet track.

There were eleven teams (each representing a different constructor) of two drivers each entered for the event. Ralf Schumacher was passed fit in the days leading up to the race. At the previous race, he had suffered a serious crash at the Sainte Devote corner and he sustained a three-inch gash on his left calf which required stitches. The Williams team had their test driver Bruno Junqueira ready to replace Ralf Schumacher should the latter have been not ready to race. Ralf Schumacher said that he would decide after the event's first free practice sessions whether he would compete. He confirmed his participation in the Grand Prix two days before the race.

Teams approached the Grand Prix by focusing on their brake cooling systems; they installed larger air intakes to adapt to the braking demands of the Circuit Gilles Villeneuve. McLaren equipped their two race cars with power steering after testing it for half a year, studying a low weight solution. BAR fitted power steering to Jacques Villeneuve's vehicle just for Friday's free practice sessions because the team wished to wait to introduce it for future events. The only teams that were not using power steering were Arrows, Minardi, Prost, and Sauber. Jaguar did not fit a bonnet designed for high load aerodynamic downforce circuits that was introduced at the Monaco Grand Prix.

Practice
There were four practice sessions that took place before the Sunday race—two one-hour sessions on Friday, and two 45-minute sessions on Saturday. The Friday morning and afternoon practice sessions took place in dry and hot weather conditions. Teams made changes to the setup of their cars while drivers tested the updates to their vehicles, reporting their effectiveness and any issues. A majority of incidents that occurred during the Friday practice session occurred at turns seven and eight.

Michael Schumacher set the quickest time of the first practice session, at 1 minute and 21.304 seconds, almost one-tenth of a second faster than teammate Barrichello. The two McLaren drivers were third and fourth respectively; Coulthard ahead of Häkkinen. Jaguar driver Eddie Irvine was fifth fastest, in front of Sauber's Johnny Herbert. Arrows' Jos Verstappen, Fisichella, Villeneuve and Marc Gené of Minardi completed the top ten fastest drivers in the session. Heidfeld damaged his car's left front suspension in a crash early in the session, and Zonta twice lost control of his vehicle by pushing hard. In the second practice session, Coulthard lapped fastest at 1:20.602 with twenty minutes remaining, the quickest time of the day. Michael Schumacher and Barrichello were second and third, with Herbert lapping quicker in fourth. Häkkinen, fifth, reported inclement handling and excess understeer on the entry to turns. Jordan's Jarno Trulli, Mika Salo of Sauber, Irvine, Fisichella and Villeneuve followed in the top ten.

The weather conditions became more breezy, cooler and cloudy in the Saturday morning practice sessions. Most of the teams fine-tuned the aerodynamics of their vehicles and used new and worn tyres at both the front and the rear. Ralf Schumacher had a new engine installed in his car due to oil pressure faults and extra downforce was added to his car which was substantially reconfigured. Häkkinen was fastest in the third practice session with a time of 1:19.115. Barrichello was second quickest, lapping 0.089 seconds slower than Häkkinen. Michael Schumacher was third fastest, ahead of Ralf Schumacher, Villeneuve, Jordan's Heinz-Harald Frentzen, Fisichella, Verstappen and Herbert in positions four to ten. Coulthard did not set a lap time during the session as his team changed his engine due to an malfunctioning electrical system. 

In the final practice session, a majority of competitors bettered their lap times. Michael Schumacher and Barrichello maintained their pace from Friday and were second and third fastest. Häkkinen was fourth quickest and was unable to lap faster as he passed an area with waved yellow flags. Trulli was fifth fastest, in front of Ralf Schumacher who was running quicker after set-up changes. Villeneuve, Frentzen, Salo and Fisichella followed in the top ten. Some drivers lost control of their cars during the session. Heidfeld's engine failed halfway through practice and dropped oil on the circuit, catching out Benetton driver Alexander Wurz. His Prost teammate Jean Alesi stopped on the grass when his car ran out of fuel. Pedro Diniz damaged the chassis and undertray of his Sauber car after mounting a kerb; he drove the spare C19 car for qualifying.

Qualifying

Saturday's afternoon one hour qualifying session saw each driver limited to twelve laps, with the grid order decided by their fastest laps. During this session, the 107% rule was in effect, which necessitated each driver set a time within 107 per cent of the quickest lap to qualify for the race. The session was held in dry and sunny weather; windy conditions were observed and there was a diminishing chance of rain. No driver appeared to venture onto the circuit that had been more dusty and slippery than in practice, particularly at turns eight and nine as well as the second chicane. Michael Schumacher achieved his third pole position of the season, and the 26th of his career, with a time of 1:18.439 set on his final lap. He was joined on the front row of the grid by Coulthard who qualified 0.098 seconds slower than Michael Schumacher's lap having duelled the latter for grid position throughout the session. Barrichello qualified third after encountering traffic and a stoppage to qualifying. Häkkinen encountered traffic during his qualifying runs and came fourth. Frentzen, fifth, dealt with heavy gusts at the L'Epingle hairpin where he found it difficult to find his braking spot. Villeneuve was sixth after locking his front tyres at the first chicane during his first full speed lap. His teammate Zonta was eighth. Trulli in seventh lacked grip in his tyres. Pedro de la Rosa in an Arrows car and Fisichella (driving with excess understeer and lack of traction) were ninth and tenth.

Herbert failed to qualify in the top ten by two hundredths of a second though he said that he was happy with his car. Ralf Schumacher set the 12th quickest lap despite his Williams lacking mechanical grip. He was ahead of Verstappen who damaged his front suspension at turn four, (a part of the circuit without a run-off area) which caused a five-minute temporary suspension to qualifying after 40 minutes. Drivers went into the pit lane and remained there until marshals cleaned the circuit and put Verstappen's car onto a flatbed truck. The resultant damage meant Verstappen drove his team's spare monocoque. Wurz, in the second Benetton, lost time when he caught the aftermath of Verstappen's collision and was 14th fastest. Salo, 15th, had his rear wheel lock on downshifts. Irvine's slower Jaguar was behind him. Alesi qualified his Prost car 17th despite an engine failure. He was ahead of Button in 18th after Button's engine cut out at maximum revolutions per minute due to fuel-pick up fault on his final two (his third and fourth) runs. Diniz was 19th. The Williams FW22's poor performance was exacerbated by the slow corners of the circuit since it performed better on tracks with faster turns and both Ralf Schumacher and Button had car setup difficulties. Gené took 20th in the faster Minardi and his teammate Gastón Mazzacane completed the starting order in 22nd after facing the possibility of transgressing the 107 per cent rule for most of the session. Mazzacane went through the gravel and crashed at the first chicane; he drove the spare Minardi entry and then Gené's race car to qualify. Heidfeld separated the two Minardi drivers in 21st.

Qualifying classification

Warm-up
The drivers took to the track at 09:30 Eastern Daylight Time (UTC-4) for a 30-minute warm-up session. It took place in cloudy and windy weather conditions that meant that the ambient temperature was below . Drivers reported issues with their cars to their teams. Michael Schumacher recorded the fastest overall time in his Ferrari with a lap of 1:18.932. His teammate Barrichello was second-quickest. The McLaren pair rounded out the top four fastest drivers; Häkkinen in third in front of Coulthard in fourth. Amongst the slower runners, the engine cover was shed from Heidfeld's car on the main straight. Zonta recorded no lap times due to an engine failure on his first lap out of the pit lane and Irvine was observed driving on wet-weather tyres on a dry circuit.

Race
The conditions on the grid were dry and cloudy before the race. Coulthard's McLaren stalled due to a clutch problem and gave a signal to his mechanics for help as the drivers began the formation lap. The mechanics restarted Coulthard's car even though they were told not to do so over the McLaren team radio, a violation of safety regulations. Coulthard was able to take his grid position before the entire field passed him. Coulthard accelerated faster than Michael Schumacher off the line though the Ferrari driver defended his position going into the first corner. Häkkinen, meanwhile, withstood Barrichello's initial attempts to pass him for third. During lap one, Villeneuve progressed from sixth to third by passing on the outside, while Verstappen went from 13th to 10th over the same distance. Häkkinen was forced wide by Villeneuve's manoeuvre and Barrichello passed him on the outside for fourth into turn two. Further down the field, a clutch fault left Irvine stalled on the grid. He was pushed by marshals to the pit lane exit.

Unlike previous years, when the field was involved in a multi-car collision, all drivers emerged without damage. At the first lap's completion, the top six drivers in the order were Michael Schumacher, Coulthard, Villeneuve, Barrichello, Häkkinen, and Frentzen. Coulthard set a fastest lap of the race, a 1:21.335 on lap two as he gained on Michael Schumacher. De la Rosa claimed sixth position from Frentzen at the hairpin on the same lap. He was unable to close up to Häkkinen due to the horsepower disadvantage provided by his engine. Michael Schumacher started to trade fastest laps with Coulthard on lap four as Villeneuve maintained third but was holding up the drivers in the next three positions behind him. This saw Michael Schumacher quickly pull clear from Villeneuve as Barrichello and Häkkinen could not overcome Villeneuve's straight line speed. Button's engine began to cut out at maximum revolutions due to a fuel pick-up issue, as Fisichella was passed by Verstappen for tenth on the same lap.

As Michael Schumacher and Coulthard continued their battle up front, the stewards informed the McLaren team on lap ten that Coulthard would serve a ten-second stop-go penalty as his mechanics had worked on his car 15 seconds before the formation lap begun. On the 13th lap, Ralf Schumacher overtook Herbert to take 12th position. Coulthard took his penalty on lap 14 and rejoined in tenth place. Herbert entered the pit lane with an gearbox issue on lap 15 and became the race's first retirement. Häkkinen unsuccessfully attempted to pass Barrichello on the front straight on lap 17. As the skies began to darken and rain showers about to arrive, De la Rosa became the first of the two stopping drivers to make a pit stop on lap 20. He reemerged in 15th position. Michael Schumacher had extended his lead over Villeneuve to 22 seconds by the 22nd lap, who in turn continued to contest Barrichello and Häkkinen for second. Frentzen was a further 1.9 seconds behind the trio ahead of him. Coulthard, meanwhile, was lapping one second slower than the race leader.

Light rain began to fall on lap 23 and the circuit started to become slippery, slowing Michael Schumacher's lap times by two seconds for two laps. Trulli passed Zonta for sixth place one lap later. Coulthard spun after he ran on oil dropped from Verstappen's car at turn 12 and lost three positions. Villeneuve lost second position when he was overtaken by Barrichello on lap 25 following a short battle and the Brazilian started to gradually close the gap to Michael Schumacher. The track had rapidly dried as Häkkinen was behind Villeneuve and Barrichello pulled away from the duo. Two laps later, Trulli overtook teammate Frentzen to take sixth. Both Ferrari drivers were trading fastest laps by lap 29. Häkkinen, meanwhile, began to mount a challenge to pass Villeneuve for third place. Further down, Zonta managed to pass Frentzen for sixth position. Frentzen was retired by his team at the end of his 33rd lap with a drop of pressure in the rear wheel braking system that softened the brake pedal.

Michael Schumacher took an early pit stop on lap 34 and Ferrari inspected his rear of his car as well as adjusting his front wing angle. Although Michael Schumacher had more fuel to do extra laps, Ferrari did not feel he was under threat; he rejoined two seconds behind his teammate Barrichello, but a heavy fuel load as well as a car malfunction slowed him. Schumacher was ahead of Häkkinen who overtook Villeneuve by braking later than Villeneuve into the first corner on lap 35. Heidfeld pulled off to the side of the track with an engine bay fire on the 36th lap after he made a pit stop. Alesi in the other Prost stalled at his pit stop and emerged ahead of Irvine. Trulli became the first front runner to make a scheduled pit stop on lap 39. Alesi retired with a sudden loss of hydraulic pressure on lap 40. Häkkinen, Ralf Schumacher, Barrichello, Zonta, Coulthard, Villeneuve and Fisichella made their pit stops over the next three laps. Salo retired with an engine failure on lap 43. All of the drivers changed from dry to wet-weather tyres as rain began to fall from lap 42 onwards when the pit stop window concluded. Häkkinen was the final driver to make such a pit stop on lap 46. Fisichella lost second position to Barrichello on the 47th lap after running wide. 
At the conclusion of lap 47, with the scheduled pit stops completed, the top six in the race order were Michael Schumacher, Barrichello, Fisichella, Häkkinen, Trulli, and Wurz. On lap 48 Michael Schumacher went straight off the wet track at turn one; he remained half a minute ahead of Barrichello. De La Rosa and Diniz were battling for 12th when contact between both drivers saw De La Rosa strike the barrier on the 49th lap. The accident caused De La Rosa's retirement due to a broken wheel. Verstappen and Wurz went off the track on lap 52 while duelling for sixth place. Verstappen was able to overtake Wurz five laps later. On lap 61, Verstappen continued to move up the field with an overtake on Trulli for fifth. Gené lost control of the rear of his car on the middle of a straight while in the act of braking and spun onto the grass on lap 65. He retired from the Grand Prix when his car stalled. Villeneuve overshot an attempted overtake on Coulthard for eighth into turn 10 on the 64th lap.

On the next lap, the rain began increasing in intensity as Villeneuve performed the same pass although he hit Ralf Schumacher, causing both drivers to retire. Coulthard made contact with Wurz at turn one, sending both drivers into the grass on lap 68. Wurz made a pit stop for repairs. Barrichello began to decrease the gap to Michael Schumacher in the final laps of the Grand Prix. Barrichello finished second 0.174 seconds behind his teammate in a formation finish, with Fisichella taking the final podium position in third because his pit stop for wet-weather tyres (following a quick decision not to install dry grooved tyres) came just as the rain fell. Häkkinen followed in fourth after passing the pit lane entry just as rainfall arrived. Verstappen was fifth and Trulli completed the points scorers in sixth. Coulthard, Zonta, Wurz and Diniz filled the next four positions, with Button, Mazzacane and Irvine finishing at least one lap behind the race winner. Ralf Schumacher, Villeneuve and Gené were the final classified runners despite not finishing the Grand Prix.

Post-race
The top three drivers appeared on the podium to collect their trophies and in the subsequent press conference. Ferrari team member Ignazio Lunetta appeared on the podium to receive the winning manufacturer's award. Michael Schumacher revealed that his early pit stop was down to a possible sensor failure which caused his team to receive misinformation. He also added that the wet-weather conditions forced him to change the entire brake balance towards the front of his car. Barrichello said that he informed Ferrari technical director Ross Brawn that it would be quicker to make an extra pit stop had it rained for ten more laps. Nevertheless, he stated that he trusted his team in their judgement and revealed his car developed an clutch issue during the Grand Prix. Fisichella stated that he was driving a conservative race as he was on a one-stop strategy. Additionally, he praised the team for their achieving a continued run of consistent podium position finishes at the circuit.

Häkkinen said that his race was "over" when the rain started to fall having not managing to achieve a higher finishing position. Jos Verstappen scored points for the first time since the 1996 Argentine Grand Prix. Verstappen said that was pleased with the result and praised his team for switching to wet tyres as he kept in contact with his mechanics. Trulli remarked that he had "never had to work so hard for one point" after the amount of pressure he came under in the race. Coulthard said that he lost the chance of victory when he stalled his car and admitted it was his mistake. On the other hand, he criticised his penalty as Coulthard believed that the race stewards should have been given more freedom by Formula One's governing body, the FIA, to decide whether a driver gained an advantage. David Tremayne of The Independent noted had Coulthard raised his hand before the start, he might have started from the back of the grid.

After the race, Villeneuve and Diniz were penalised 25 seconds–which were added to their total race times–by the stewards for their collisions with Ralf Schumacher and de la Rosa respectively since a decision was not reached prior to the race's final five laps. Villeneuve and Diniz were each given a reprimand after a review of video footage and interviews of all the involved drivers. McLaren team principal Ron Dennis was critical of Villeneuve's driving during the event, saying he was driving "in a way that was verging on the kamikaze. He had nothing to lose and was driving in Canada in front of his home crowd and was clearly on a mission." Villeneuve admitted he was fault for causing the accident that saw him collide with Ralf Schumacher and apologised to Schumacher. De La Rosa thought it would better for all to watch footage of his accident with Diniz on television and called Diniz's manoeuvre "very dangerous". Diniz felt that De La Rosa should have been more intelligent by slowing.

The result extended Michael Schumacher's points tally in the World Drivers' Championship to 56 points, 22 in front of second-placed Coulthard. Häkkinen remained in third position, two points behind his teammate, while Barrichello in fourth reduced his gap to Häkkinen to four points. Fisichella's third-place finish saw him retain fifth on 18 points. In the World Constructors' Championship, Ferrari's one-two result saw them extend their advantage over McLaren to eighteen points. Benetton overtook Williams for third position, while BAR retained fifth position, with nine races of the season remaining. Despite the extended points lead that Michael Schumacher and Ferrari had, Coulthard maintained his view that his main competitors could be caught in the season's nine remaining races saying "There's still a long way to go in the championship and anything can happen."

Race classification
Drivers who scored championship points are denoted in bold.

Championship standings after the race 

Drivers' Championship standings

Constructors' Championship standings

Note: Only the top five positions are included for both sets of standings.

References

Canadian Grand Prix
Grand Prix
Canadian Grand Prix
2000 in Quebec
2000s in Montreal
Grand Prix